Bexley and Bromley is a constituency represented in the London Assembly. It consists of the combined areas of the London Borough of Bexley and the London Borough of Bromley. The constituency is represented by Peter Fortune, a Conservative first elected in the 2021 election.

Overlapping constituencies
In elections to Westminster it includes mostly, although not exclusively, Conservative-voting areas. The equivalent Westminster seats after the 2019 general election are:
Beckenham - Colonel Bob Stewart DSO (Conservative)
Bexleyheath and Crayford - David Evenett (Conservative)
Bromley and Chislehurst - Bob Neill (Conservative)
Old Bexley and Sidcup - Louie French (Conservative)
Orpington - Gareth Bacon (Conservative, the former AM for Bexley and Bromley)
The part of Erith and Thamesmead that is in the London Borough of Bexley - Abena Oppong-Asare (Labour)
The part of Lewisham West and Penge that is in the London Borough of Bromley - Ellie Reeves (Labour)

Party averages 
Conservatives - 47.8%,
Labour - 20.1%, 
Liberal Democrats - 12.9%,
UKIP - 10.8%,
Greens - 6.0%

Assembly members

Mayoral election results 
Below are the results for the candidate who received the highest share of the popular vote in the constituency at each mayoral election.

Assembly election results

References

London Assembly constituencies
Politics of the London Borough of Bexley
Politics of the London Borough of Bromley
2000 establishments in England
Constituencies established in 2000